Eric John Filby (1917-2004) was a male English international table tennis and lawn tennis player.

He won a bronze medal at the 1938 World Table Tennis Championships in the men's doubles with Hyman Lurie.

In 1950 he moved from Norfolk to Croydon.

Filby played in the 1955 Wimbledon Championships – Men's Singles.

See also
 List of England players at the World Team Table Tennis Championships
 List of World Table Tennis Championships medalists

References

English male table tennis players
1917 births
2004 deaths
World Table Tennis Championships medalists
English male tennis players
British male tennis players